This is a list of flag bearers who have represented Grenada at the Olympics.

Flag bearers carry the national flag of their country at the opening ceremony of the Olympic Games.

See also
Grenada at the Olympics

References

Flag bearers
Grenada
Olympic flagbearers